The 2019 Rally Turkey (also known as Marmaris Rally Turkey 2019) is a motor racing event for rally cars that was held over four days between 12 and 15 September 2019. It marked the twelfth running of Rally Turkey and was the eleventh round of the 2019 World Rally Championship, World Rally Championship-2 and the newly-created WRC-2 Pro class.

Ott Tänak and Martin Järveoja were the defending rally winners. Their team, Toyota Gazoo Racing WRT, were the defending manufacturers' winners. The Škoda Motorsport crew of Jan Kopecký and Pavel Dresler were the defending winners in the World Rally Championship-2 category, but they did not defend their titles as they were promoted to the newly-created WRC-2 Pro class.

Reigning World Drivers' and World Co-Drivers Champions Sébastien Ogier and Julien Ingrassia won in Turkey for the first time in their careers. Their team, Citroën World Rally Team, were the manufacturers' winners. The M-Sport Ford WRT crew of Gus Greensmith and Elliott Edmondson won the WRC-2 Pro category, while the Polish crew of Kajetan Kajetanowicz and Maciej Szczepaniak won the wider WRC-2 class to take the championship lead, finishing third in the combined WRC-2 category.

Background

Championship standings prior to the event
Ott Tänak and Martin Järveoja led both the drivers' and co-drivers' championships by thirty-three-points ahead of Thierry Neuville and Nicolas Gilsoul. Defending world champions Sébastien Ogier and Julien Ingrassia were third, a further seven points behind. In the World Rally Championship for Manufacturers, Hyundai Shell Mobis WRT held an eight-point lead over Toyota Gazoo Racing WRT.

In the World Rally Championship-2 Pro standings, Kalle Rovanperä and Jonne Halttunen were forty-one points ahead of Mads Østberg and Torstein Eriksen in the drivers' and co-drivers' standings respectively. Gus Greensmith and Elliott Edmondson were third, another twenty-five points further back. In the manufacturers' championship, Škoda Motorsport led M-Sport Ford WRT by twenty-nine points, with Citroën Total eighty-five points behind in third.

In the World Rally Championship-2 standings, Nikolay Gryazin and Yaroslav Fedorov led the drivers' and co-drivers' standings by four points respectively. Benito Guerra and Jaime Zapata were second, while Pierre-Louis Loubet and Vincent Landais were third, six points separating them.

Entry list
The following crews entered into the rally. The event opened to crews competing in the World Rally Championship, World Rally Championship-2, WRC-2 Pro and privateer entries not registered to score points in any championship. A total of thirty-one entries were received, with ten crews entered with World Rally Cars and sixteen entered the World Rally Championship-2. Three crews were nominated to score points in the Pro class.

Route
Two brand new stages were introduced into the route, while the twisty Çiçekli stage has moved from Friday to Sunday and runs in opposite direction.

Itinerary
All dates and times are TRT (UTC+3).

Report

World Rally Cars
The M-Sport Ford WRT crew of Elfyn Evans and Scott Martin had been due to return, having missed the Rallies of Finland and Germany when Evans injured himself in a pre-event testing accident while preparing for Rally Finland. However, Evans' recovery necessitated further delays, with Wales Rally GB earmarked for their return.

Several drivers suffered punctures, including three Toyota drivers and Dani Sordo. Esapekka Lappi led into the second leg, following by champion teammate Sébastien Ogier. Thierry Neuville was in the eighth spot after the morning loop, but a masterful drive in the afternoon loop promoted the Belgian to third.

Saturday was full of dramas. At the opening stage of the leg, championship contender Neuville went off the road and lost approximately four minutes, which dropped him down to ninth. Moments later, championship leader Ott Tänak was out as well. His Yaris broke down at the road section and was unable to move further, which means his day was over. Following Ogier's major rivals in troubles, the defending world champion put himself on the top of the leaderboard as of Friday, just 0.2 second ahead of teammate Lappi. Eventually, they both safely completed the rally to bring Citroën their first 1-2 finish since 2015 Rally Argentina.

Classification

Special stages

Championship standings

World Rally Championship-2 Pro
Jan Kopecký survived a day of "rockstorm" after two punctures, while his teammate Kalle Rovanperä retired form the day as he rolled his Fabia in the morning's opening test. However, Kopecký suffered yet another puncture, which lost his lead to Gus Greensmith. However, Greensmith rolled his Fiesta R5 after the flying finish at the second to last stage. He was able to complete the final test to take his second Pro victory.

Classification

Special stages
Results in bold denote first in the RC2 class, the class which both the WRC-2 Pro and WRC-2 championships run to.

Championship standings

World Rally Championship-2
Local driver Bugra Banaz's rally was over as his Fiesta R5 burnt out on the liaison section to the final stage. Kajetan Kajetanowicz held a three-minute lead after Saturday after two drama-free days. However, he broke a driveshaft on Sunday, but managed to bring his wounded Fabia home to take his first victory of season in the category.

Classification

Special stages
Results in bold denote first in the RC2 class, the class which both the WRC-2 Pro and WRC-2 championships run to.

Championship standings

Notes

References

External links
  
 2019 Rally Turkey in e-wrc website
 The official website of the World Rally Championship

Turkey
2019 in Turkish motorsport
September 2019 sports events in Turkey
2019